was a Japanese film director and screenwriter who directed 26 films between 1932 and 1938. He was a contemporary of Yasujirō Ozu, Mikio Naruse and Kenji Mizoguchi and one of the primary figures in the development of the jidaigeki, or historical film. Yamanaka died of dysentery in Manchuria after being drafted into the Imperial Japanese Army. He is the uncle of the Japanese film director Tai Kato, who wrote a book about Yamanaka, Eiga kantoku Yamanaka Sadao.

Only three of his films survive in nearly complete form. While long considered a master filmmaker in his native Japan, interest in Yamanaka's work redeveloped after the restoration and Japanese DVD release of the three surviving films. His most internationally discussed film, Humanity and Paper Balloons (1937), was given its first non-Japanese DVD release in the UK as a Masters of Cinema release.

Career
Yamanaka began his career in the Japanese film industry at the age of 20 as a writer and assistant director for the Makino company.

In 1932, he began working for Kanjuro Productions, a small, independent film company similar to many others founded during the same period as it was centered around a popular jidaigeki film star, this time Kanjuro Arashi. Here, he began directing his first films, all of which were jidaigeki. During his first year at Kanjuro, he made six films. He was "discovered" by the critic Matsuo Kishi and gained a reputation for creating films that escaped clichés and focused on social injustices. He formed the Narutaki-gumi with his friends, and they wrote under the pseudonym Kimpachi Kajiwara.

During the 1930s he moved between several film companies, eventually settling in Kyoto and working for the Nikkatsu Company. Most of his films were silent films as sound did not gain a prominence in Japan until 1935-36. He worked twice with the Japanese theatre troupe Zenshin-za: first on The Village Tattooed Man (Machi no Irezumi-mono, 1935) and on his final film, Humanity and Paper Balloons.

Humanity and Paper Balloons premiered the same day that Yamanaka was drafted into the Japanese army. He later died in a field hospital in the Japanese ruled Manchukuo, known today as Manchuria. The cause of death was inflammation of the intestines.

Style and influences
Early on, Yamanaka had stated an interest in blurring the lines between several genres: comedy, historical epics, and comedy-dramas focusing on average people. Viewers and critics (notably, Donald Richie and Tadao Sato in pioneering studies of Japanese cinema) note in his surviving films the genesis of ideas later explored by the internationally successful Akira Kurosawa, Kenji Mizoguchi, Yasujirō Ozu and Seijun Suzuki.

Yamanaka has been characterized as a minimalist, one whose style favoured elegance and rhythm. In fact, he was a close friend of Ozu, who is often noted as a minimalist too.

Yamanaka is said to have been inspired by Hollywood films such as Rouben Mamoulian's City Streets, Edmund Goulding's Grand Hotel and Frank Capra's It Happened One Night.

Director Kazuo Kuroki once said of Yamanaka, "Every film he made wonderfully depicted human purity and chastity with a tender, delicate gaze. I was astonished that a young man in his twenties accomplished such perfection."

Partial filmography (surviving films)
 The Million Ryo Pot (1935) - also known as Tange Sazen Yowa: Hyakuman Ryo no Tsubo  (丹下左膳余話  百万両の壺)
 Kōchiyama Sōshun (1936) (河内山宗俊)
 Humanity and Paper Balloons (1937) - also known as Ninjo Kamifusen (人情紙風船)

References

External links
 
 

Japanese film directors
Samurai film directors
1909 births
1938 deaths
20th-century Japanese people
20th-century Japanese screenwriters
Imperial Japanese Army personnel
Military personnel of the Second Sino-Japanese War
Deaths from dysentery